Beaver Township is a township in Polk County, Iowa, United States.

History
Beaver Township was organized before 1852. It was partitioned from land in Camp Township. It was reduced in size in 1878 when Clay Township was formed, taking a two-mile strip off its west side.

Its elevation is listed as 912 feet above mean sea level.

References

Townships in Polk County, Iowa
Townships in Iowa
Populated places established in 1852